Charaxes saperanus is a butterfly in the family Nymphalidae. It is found on Mayotte, an island in the Indian Ocean off the coast of southeast Africa. The habitat consists of dry forests and patches of vegetation between plantations.

The larvae feed on Allophylus species.

Taxonomy
Charaxes varanes group.Subgenus Stonehamia (Hadrodontes)

The group members are: 
Charaxes varanes
Charaxes fulvescens - very similar to varanes
Charaxes acuminatus - very pointed forewing
Charaxes balfouri
Charaxes analava
Charaxes nicati
Charaxes bertrami - perhaps subspecies of varanes
Charaxes saperanus
Charaxes defulvata

References

Charaxes saperanus images at Bold

Butterflies described in 1926
saperanus
Endemic fauna of Mayotte